Florinda may refer to:
 Florinda coccinea, the blacktailed red sheetweaver
 Florinda (TV series) from the Philippines
 Florinda, Florida, a former community

As a given name
 Florinda la Cava, legendary Spaniard
 Florinda Bolkan, Brazilian actress
 Florinda Donner, German-born American author and anthropologist
 Florinda Grandino de Oliveira, birth name of Linda Batista, Brazilian musician
  Florinda Handcock, Viscountess Castlemaine, wife of William Handcock, 1st Viscount Castlemaine
 Florinda Meza, Mexican actress
 Florinda da Rosa Silva Chan, Macau civil servant

Creative works
 Florinda, or les Maures en Espagne,  an 1851 an opera by Sigismond Thalberg
 Florinda (painting), an 1852 painting by Franz Xaver Winterhalter